Knotts Creek is a  tidal inlet on the south shore of the Nansemond River in the city of Suffolk, Virginia, in the United States.

See also
List of rivers of Virginia

References

USGS Hydrologic Unit Map - State of Virginia (1974)

Rivers of Virginia
Tributaries of the James River
Rivers of Suffolk, Virginia